The Minister for Cyber Security is an Australian Government cabinet position which is currently held by Clare O'Neil following the swearing in of the full Albanese ministry on 1 June 2022.

In the Government of Australia, the minister administers this portfolio through the Department of Home Affairs.

List of Ministers for Cyber Security
The following individuals have been appointed as Minister for Cyber Security, or any of its precedent titles:

List of Ministers Assisting the Prime Minister for Cyber Security
The following individuals have been appointed as Minister Assisting the Prime Minister for Cyber Security, or any of its precedent titles:

References

External links
 

Cyber Security